Poovukkul Boogambam is a 1988 Indian Tamil-language action war film written, produced and directed by Thiagarajan, making his directorial debut. The film stars himself and Parvathy alongside B. Saroja Devi and Charan Raj in supporting roles. The soundtrack was composed by S. P. Venkatesh, credited as Sangeetharajan. The film was released on 13 April 1988.

Plot

Cast 
Thiagarajan
Parvathy
B. Saroja Devi
Charan Raj
Janagaraj

Production 
The film marked the production and directorial debut of Thiagarajan who also appeared in the lead role. Inspired by an article of real-life military officer Sundarji, Thiagarajan decided to write script on it. Thiagarajan held shooting in an army camp near Faizabad along with nearly 3,500 soldiers and also shot at military centres near New Delhi after obtaining permission from Indian Army. Khushbu was originally chosen as the lead actress, but she was later replaced by Parvathy.

Soundtrack 
Soundtrack was composed by S. P. Venkatesh, credited as Sangeetharajan.

Release and reception 
Poovukkul Boogambam was released on 13 April 1988. N. Krishnaswamy of The Indian Express in his review dated 15 April 1988 noted that Thiagarajan is accountable for the film's merits and drawbacks and also stated the script "is very clearly unable to cope up with the conflict [sic]". He however appreciated the film's music and photography. Jayamanmadhan of Kalki wrote that, by taking an average plot and adding the word Army Army before every sentence of the story, Thiagarajan has made an earthquake within the flower.

References

External links 
 

1980s action war films
1980s Tamil-language films
1988 directorial debut films
1988 films
Films scored by S. P. Venkatesh
Indian action war films